Irving Sandler (July 22, 1925 – June 2, 2018) was an American art critic, art historian, and educator. He provided numerous first hand accounts of American art, beginning with abstract expressionism in the 1950s. He also managed the Tanager Gallery downtown and co-ordinated the New York Artists Club (the "Club") of the New York School from 1955 to its demise in 1962 as well as documenting numerous conversations at the Cedar Street Tavern and other art venues. Al Held named him, "Our Boswell of the New York scene," and Frank O'Hara immortalized him as the "balayeur des artistes" (sweeper-up after artists) because of Sandler's constant presence and habit of taking notes at art world events. Sandler saw himself as an impartial observer of this period, as opposed to polemical advocates such as Clement Greenberg and Harold Rosenberg.

Biography
Sandler was a child of Eastern European Jewish immigrants. His parents were advocates of socialism. Sandler was born in Brooklyn. His family relocated to Philadelphia, then to Winnipeg, and finally back to Philadelphia. He served as a second lieutenant in the U.S. Marine Corps for three years in the Second World War. He received a bachelor's degree from Temple University in 1948, and a master's degree from the University of Pennsylvania in 1950. He did some additional graduate work at Columbia University, but ultimately finished a doctoral degree at New York University much later, in 1976.  He started writing art criticism at the behest of Thomas B. Hess for ARTnews in 1956, and was a senior critic there through 1962. He has taught at several universities, including the Pratt Institute, New York University, and the State University of New York at Purchase, where he was appointed a founding professor in the School of Art+Design (then called the Visual Arts Division) in 1972, and where he remained until his retirement.

Sandler curated several critically acclaimed exhibitions including the "Concrete Expressionism Show" in 1965 at New York University, which featured the work of painters Al Held and Knox Martin and the sculptors Ronald Bladen, George Sugarman and David Weinrib, and "The Prospect Mountain Sculpture Show" in 1977. Sandler interviewed many American artists throughout his long career, including first generation abstract expressionists such as Robert Motherwell, Willem de Kooning, Phillip Guston, and Franz Kline in 1957 and later pop protagonists such as Tom Wesselmann in 1984. Many of these interviews are part of the Archives of American Art Oral History Program at the Smithsonian Institution, as well as available from the Irving Sandler Papers at the Getty Research Institute. In 1972, he co-founded the not-for-profit alternative gallery Artists Space with Trudie Grace, which helped launch the careers of Judy Pfaff, Barbara Kruger and Cindy Sherman amongst others.

As indicated in the bibliography below, Sandler authored several monographs on individual artists as well as a sweeping, four-volume survey of contemporary art (The Triumph of American Painting: A History of Abstract Expressionism (1970), The New York School: The Painters and Sculptors of the Fifties (1978), American Art of the 1960s (1988), and Art of the Postmodern Era: From the Late 1960s to the Early 1990s (1996). Robert Storr has described the history, "Narrative, untheoretical--at times antitheoretical--and unapologetically focused not just on what happened in the United States but principally on what happened in Manhattan, Sandler's surveys have been widely criticized but even more widely used, not least because they are readable and deeply informed by their author's unrivaled access to the artists and art-worldings about whom he writes."  Sandler continued to write about art during his final years and was concerned with readdressing his earlier "canonical" works on abstract expressionism with the benefit of historical distance. In 2009 he published Abstract Expressionism and the American Experience: a Reevaluation. His first novel, Goodbye to Tenth Street, was published posthumously in late 2018.

Sandler died on June 2, 2018, at the age of 92.

Selected works

 

 

	

 Introduction by Russell Panczenko.

 A collection of Sandler's writings spanning six decades.
 Foreword by Raphael Rubinstein.

Irving Sandler (2015). Swept Up By Art: An Art Critic in the Post-Avant-Garde Era. New York: Rail Editions, 2015.
Irving Sandler (2018). Goodbye to Tenth Street. Seattle, WA: Pleasure Boat Studio: A Literary Press, 2018.

References

External links
 
Irving Sandler papers, ca. 1950-2000. Research Library at the Getty Research Institute. Los Angeles, California. 
 Irving Sandler in conversation with Roberta Smith for the Brooklyn Rail, April 2009.
  Irving Sandler interview with Phong Bui in front of a live audience for Art International Radio, November 2013.
 Irving Sandler in conversation with Jerry Saltz for the Brooklyn Rail, September 2008.

1925 births
2018 deaths
American art critics
American art historians
American memoirists
United States Marine Corps personnel of World War II
Columbia University alumni
New York University alumni
State University of New York faculty
Temple University alumni
University of Pennsylvania alumni
Military personnel from Philadelphia
Writers from Philadelphia
Writers from New York City
United States Marine Corps officers